Huon of Bordeaux is the title character of a 13th-century French epic poem with romance elements.

Huon of Bordeaux 
The poem tells of Huon, a knight who unwittingly kills Charlot, the son of Emperor Charlemagne. He is given a reprieve from death on condition that he fulfil a number of seemingly impossible tasks: he must travel to the court of the Emir of  Babylon and return with a handful of the Emir's hair and teeth, slay the Emir's mightiest knight, and three times kiss the Emir's daughter, Esclarmonde. Huon eventually accomplishes all these feats with the assistance of the fairy king Oberon.

Editions and continuations 
The chanson de geste that survives (in three more or less complete manuscripts and two short fragments) comprises 10,553 decasyllable verses grouped in 91 assonanced laisses.  Presumed dates for its composition vary, but 1216 and 1268 are generally given as terminus post quem (earliest possible date) and terminus ante quem (latest possible date).

The chanson'''s success gave rise to six continuations and one prologue which triple its length:Roman d'Aubéron – the Turin manuscript of the romance (the only manuscript to contain all of the continuations) contains the only version of this 14th-century prologue in the shape of a separate romance of Auberon. Auberon also refers to the title of another chanson de geste, Auberon, written as the prologue to Huon de Bordeaux. No prose version exists.Huon Roi de FéérieChanson d'EsclarmondeChanson de Clarisse et FlorentChanson d'Yde et d'OliveChanson de Godin – the Turin manuscript of the romance contains the only version of this 13th–14th century continuation. No prose version exists. The Turin manuscript also contains the romance of Les Lorrains, a summary in seventeen lines of another version of the story, according to which Huon's exile is due to his having slain a count in the emperor's palace.Roman de CroissantThe poem and most of its continuations were converted to a rhymed version in alexandrines in 1454 (only one manuscript exists). While no manuscript exists from the 15th century prose version, this version served as the base text for 16th century printed editions (eleven exist), the earliest extant being the edition printed by Michel le Noir in 1513. The work was reprinted ten times in the 17th century, eight times in the 18th and four times in the 19th (notably in a beautifully printed and illustrated adaptation in modern French by Gaston Paris in 1898).

The romance came into vogue in England through the translation (c. 1540) of John Bourchier, Lord Berners, as Huon of Burdeuxe, through which Shakespeare heard of the French epic. In Philip Henslowe's diary there is a note of a performance of a play, Hewen of Burdocize, on December 28, 1593. The tale was dramatized and produced in Paris by the Confrérie de la Passion in 1557.

The tale also serves as the basis for Christoph Martin Wieland's epic poem Oberon of 1780, where Huon becomes the lover of the Sultan's daughter Rezia/Amanda. Andre Norton retold the tale in quasi-modern English prose as Huon of the Horn, published by Harcourt, Brace & Company in 1951, which is considered her first fantasy novel.

 Historical sources 
The Charlot of the story has been identified by Auguste Longnon (Romania'' vol. viii) with Charles the Child, one of the sons of Charles the Bald and Ermentrude of Orléans, who died in 866 in consequence of wounds inflicted by a certain Aubouin in precisely similar circumstances to those related in the romance. The godfather of Huon may safely be identified with Seguin, who was count of Bordeaux under Louis the Pious in 839, and died fighting against the Vikings six years later. Huon himself is probably based on Hunald I, duke of Aquitaine in the 8th century, who was defeated by Charlemagne's father.

References

Bibliography

Translations

External links
 

13th-century books
Chansons de geste
Epic poems in French
Fictional French people
Fictional knights
French folklore
French poems
Male characters in literature
Medieval French romances
Medieval legends